Hermeneutics is a theory of text interpretation.

Hermeneutics may also refer to:
 The hermeneutic circle, the process of understanding a text hermeneutically
 Biblical hermeneutics, the study of the principles of interpretation of the Bible
 Environmental hermeneutics, applies the techniques and resources of hermeneutics to environmental issues
 Philosophical hermeneutics, a theory of knowledge initiated by Martin Heidegger
 Quranic hermeneutics, study of theories of the interpretation and understanding of the Qur'an, the Muslim holy book
 Talmudic hermeneutics, the rules and methods for investigating the meaning of the Jewish scriptures
 Theological hermeneutics, the application of hermeneutics to theological texts
 Vedic hermeneutics (Mīmāṃsā), the exegesis of the Vedas, the earliest holy texts of Hinduism
 Hermeneutic style, an elaborate style of Latin in early medieval Europe

See also 
 Double hermeneutic
 Hermetic (disambiguation)